1-Phosphatidylinositol-4,5-bisphosphate phosphodiesterase beta-4 is an enzyme that in humans is encoded by the PLCB4 gene.

Function 

The protein encoded by this gene catalyzes the formation of inositol 1,4,5-trisphosphate and diacylglycerol from phosphatidylinositol 4,5-bisphosphate. This reaction uses calcium as a cofactor and plays an important role in the intracellular transduction of many extracellular signals in the retina. Two transcript variants encoding different isoforms have been found for this gene.

References

Further reading

EC 3.1.4